The Rensselaer and Saratoga Railroad: Green Island Shops were two historic buildings and one historic structure located at Green Island, Albany County, New York. The buildings were built in 1871 by the Rensselaer and Saratoga Railroad. The shops remained in operation into the late 1930s.

It was added to the National Register of Historic Places in 1973.

On March 3, 2011 the structure caught fire. The fire started on the third floor and quickly spread to the first. The building was demolished a few weeks later.

See also
National Register of Historic Places listings in Albany County, New York

References

External links

Railway buildings and structures on the National Register of Historic Places in New York (state)
Transport infrastructure completed in 1871
Transportation buildings and structures in Albany County, New York
Historic American Engineering Record in New York (state)
National Register of Historic Places in Albany County, New York
Railway depots on the National Register of Historic Places